This is a list of airlines which have an Air Operator Certificate issued by the Civil Aviation Authority  of Bolivia.

See also
 List of airlines
 List of defunct airlines of Bolivia

Bolivia

Airlines
Airlines
Bolivia